David Abbott "Ab" Jenkins (January 25, 1883 – August 9, 1956) was the 24th mayor of Salt Lake City, Utah between 1940 to 1944. He was a professional race car driver. Jenkins' interest in motorsports began with racing motorcycles on dirt tracks and across country. He then became interested in land speed records at the Bonneville Salt Flats. He was instrumental in establishing Bonneville as a location for such events, and in attracting overseas drivers such as George Eyston and Sir Malcolm Campbell to compete there.

In 1940 Jenkins set the 24-hour record of a  average that lasted for 50 years (until 1990).

He died on a visit to Milwaukee, Wisconsin.

Safety record
Often referred to as "The World's Safest Speedster," Jenkins was the father of salt racing. The amount of miles he drove in 50 years included nearly three million kilometers, which included 42 coast-to-coast trips across the continental United States. There were two speed runs, however, after 1931, he confined his efforts to the track alone.

Early Days and Records
Jenkins, a home building contractor in Utah who was born in 1883, gained his first taste of racing a Studebaker on the Union Pacific train from Salt Lake City to Wendover in 1925, beating the smoke-belcher by five minutes. A few years later, in 1926, he drove from New York City to San Francisco in a Studebaker touring sedan in 86 hours, 20 minutes, a time that was 14 hours faster than the train. A series of records were set in Pierce-Arrows as well as a sixty-eight miles per hour (109 km/h) run on the Salt Flats on an Allis-Chalmers tractor, which he remarked was "like riding a frightened bison" before building a series of cars manufactured specifically for the Salt Flats.

In 1925, Jenkins was hired by Pierce-Arrow to soup up their newly introduced V12 engine which produced a disappointing level of performance at the time. He managed to coax  out of the engine, driving a Pierce-Arrow along the Utah salt flats at over 100 miles per hour (160 km/h) in a 24-hour journey along a 10-mile (16 km) course. As a result of the run, a total distance of 2,710 miles (4,360 kilometers) was covered. It was in the following year that he set out to break that record by driving 25 hours and 30 minutes at around 117 miles per hour (188 km/h) and making a total of 3,000 miles (4,800 km) in the process.

The Bonneville Salt Flats became more popular during the 1930s as speed records were being broken regularly, so it was deemed that the sands of Daytona Beach or the Monthlhéry track in France were preferable to the sands of the Bonneville Salt Flats. During the summer of 1935, the course was gaining international attention and in July of that year, Jenkins provided accommodations to British driver John Cobb and even relinquished his spot on the flats to him. During the course of the run, Cobb was able to break Jenkins' records and set a new one.

Realizing that he needed even more power to stay on top, Jenkins equipped his car with a Curtiss Conqueror aircraft engine. The Salt Lake City newspaper Deseret News ran a contest to give the vehicle a name, which ended up being dubbed the "Mormon Meteor". Due to extensive modifications needed to accommodate the Curtiss engine, it quickly became the Mormon Meteor II and Jenkins broke land speed endurance records with it during 1936-37.

In 1938, he debuted the Mormon Meteor III, setting even more records.

During WWII, the US government ordered a halt to racing activities and Jenkins decided to run for mayor of Salt Lake City, winning handily despite spending no time or money campaigning.

After the war, Jenkins resumed racing. The radiator was punctured by the accident and Jenkins had to halt his overheating vehicle. He had stopped three minutes short of breaking a new one-hour speed record and at the age of 68, he decided it was time to retire.

Considering his limited resources, Jenkins enjoyed remarkable achievements, something on the order of Will Rogers with a motorized persona. He was a deeply religious man, who put his faith in God, and by God, he went far, especially driving his “Mormon Meteor” speed machines.
Harvey Firestone was an avid admirer. Jenkins became pals with New York Metropolitan Opera Singer Richard Bonelli when they were working as mechanics before Bonelli discovered he could sing. Bonelli attended many of Jenkins record runs and often instigated a song fest with spectators joining the famous baritone as Ab whizzed past. 
Jenkins racing fame coupled with his congenial, outgoing nature got him elected Mayor of Salt Lake in 1940 without ever giving a speech, or spending a nickel on a campaign. He served until 1944 setting 21 speed records while in office.
His one-man 24-hour record averaging , stood for 50 years, beaten in 1990 by an eight driver team. Jenkins's exhausting, 48-hour record is still on the books together with 15 other FIA records from 1940.

In 1956, Pontiac executives petitioned Jenkins to make a comeback. In one of his final interviews that June, he reported that his health was good and he felt up to it. Jenkins and his son Marvin to drive its stock-model Series 860 Pontiac around the famous  salt circle track. The pair recorded an average speed of  shattering all existing American unlimited and Class C stock-car racing records in the process.

Ab drove almost two-thirds of the  himself gulping down milk and orange juice handed to him by his wife or daughter during his 30-second fueling pit stops. He did not smoke or drink alcohol. Father-and-son dominated the record book claiming a total of 28 records.

Ab's Passing

The same year, Ab had the opportunity to drive a Pontiac pace car in Elkhart Lake, Wisconsin, at the Road America race in August of that year. Jenkins was returning from a baseball game with Pontiac executives George Bourke and Robert Emerick on August 9 when he noticed a billboard with a farm tractor on it and started telling the men about his wild ride in 1935 when he suddenly grabbed his chest and passed away from a heart attack.

The next year, General Motors introduced the 1957 Pontiac “Bonneville” in honor of Ab and Marv's achievements making it the first, and perhaps the only car to ever “earn” its name and not simply be “given” its name by an automaker.

Of the 630 limited production run, each dealer got only one, making it the rarest of all Pontiacs ever produced. The new Bonneville was the fastest of the division –  in 8.1 seconds thanks to the new fuel injected V8 that cranked out 300HP plus. 
All convertibles, all automatics, the car delivered loaded with options for $5,782 – approaching double that of the Star Chief Custom Convertible ($3,105) with which it shared the  chassis.

Jenkins Peak was named in his honor in 1960. The mountain is located north of the Bonneville Speedway and is prominently visible from there.

References

Further reading

External links
SAE International web site

1883 births
1956 deaths
Latter Day Saints from Utah
Duesenberg
Sports world record setters
Land speed record people
Mayors of Salt Lake City
People from Spanish Fork, Utah
Racing drivers from Utah
20th-century American politicians